Zulma Nélida Brandoni de Gasparini (born 15 May 1944) is an Argentinian paleontologist and zoologist. She is known for discovering the fossils of the dinosaur Gasparinisaura, which was named after her.

Work 
Born in the city of La Plata, Argentina on 15 May 1944, Brandoni de Gasparini graduated in zoology from the National University of La Plata in 1966 and obtained her PhD in Natural Sciences in 1973.

Zulma Brandoni de Gasparini was internationally recognized in the nineties for leading the team that discovered the Gasparinisaura. She is a recognized expert in Mesozoic reptilians of South America.

In 1972, she started her scientific career at the CONICET, in which was promoted in 2003 to the grade of Superior Researcher. She is today professor in Paleontology of Vertebrates in the National University of La Plata.

Honours 
Brandoni de Gasparini has been awarded, among others recognitions, the Prize "Bernardo Houssay" of the CONICET (1987), the Prize to the Merit of the Argentinian Paleontological Association (2001) and the Prize Florentino Ameghino of the National Academy of Exact and Natural Sciences (2002). She received the Prize Pellegrino Strobel in 2013.

References 

Argentine biologists
Argentine paleontologists
20th-century Argentine zoologists
1944 births
Living people
Argentine women scientists
Women biologists
Women paleontologists
Women zoologists
Zoologists with author abbreviations
National University of La Plata alumni
Academic staff of the National University of La Plata
Argentine people of Italian descent
People from La Plata
20th-century women scientists
21st-century women scientists
Argentine women archaeologists